Acrisorcin is a topical anti-infective typically used as a fungicide. It is a combination of the active ingredients 9-aminoacridine and 4-hexylresorcinol.



History

Acrisorcin was marketed as a cream under the trade name Akrinol, which has since been discontinued. It was developed at Indiana State University in 1961.

Indications

Acrisorcin was used to combat pityriasis versicolor.

References 

Antifungals
Combination drugs